Band of Brothers is the third studio album by American heavy metal band Hellyeah. The album was released on July 17, 2012, under record label Eleven Seven Music.  Two singles from the album have been released; "War In Me" was released on April 3, 2012, and title track, "Band of Brothers", was released on May 8, 2012. This is the last album to feature guitarist Greg Tribbett and bassist Bob Zilla.

Track listing

Personnel
Chad Gray – vocals
Greg Tribbett – lead guitar
Tom Maxwell – rhythm guitar
Bob Zilla – bass
Vinnie Paul – drums

References

2012 albums
Hellyeah albums
Eleven Seven Label Group albums